Anastasia Myskina defeated Elena Dementieva in the final, 6–1, 6–2 to win the women's singles tennis title at the 2004 French Open. It was her maiden major singles title, and she became the first Russian woman to win a major. Myskina became the first woman in the Open Era to win the French Open after saving a match point, doing so in the fourth round against Svetlana Kuznetsova. This marked the first time two maiden major finalists contested a final since the 1979 Australian Open. The final also made Russia the fourth country in the Open Era (following Australia, the United States, and Belgium) to have two countrywomen contest a major final.

Justine Henin-Hardenne was the defending champion, but lost in the second round to Tathiana Garbin. This was her only loss at the French Open between 2003 and 2007.

This marked the first major in which future two-time French Open champion Maria Sharapova reached the quarterfinals.

Martina Navratilova played in her first major since 1994, being unseeded for the first time since the 1973 US Open. Awarded a wild card, it was her final French Open singles appearance; she lost in the first round to Gisela Dulko.

Seeds

Qualifying

Draw

Finals

Top half

Section 1

Section 2

Section 3

Section 4

Bottom half

Section 5

Section 6

Section 7

Section 8

Championship match statistics

References

External links
2004 French Open – Women's draws and results at the International Tennis Federation

Women's Singles
French Open by year – Women's singles
French Open - Women's Singles
2004 in women's tennis
2004 in French women's sport